Charles Bruce Dellit (7 November 1898 – 21 August 1942) was an Australian architect who pioneered the Art Deco style in Australia. He was generally known as Bruce Dellit.

Early life
Dellit was born on 7 November 1898 in Darlington, Sydney Australia. He was the son of Albert Dellit, a furniture manufacturer and Agnes Gertrude Mack. His full siblings were Albert Cormack, Leo Harold and Ena May. As a child, he attended Christian Brothers' College, Waverley. After leaving school, Dellit gained employment with the architect John L. Berry and at 16 he enrolled at the Sydney Technical College From 1919, Dellit studied architecture under Professor Leslie Wilkinson at the University of Sydney for one day a week.

Career
From 1918 Dellit worked for Hall & Prentice in Queensland and, after returning to Sydney, joined Spain & Cosh in 1922. He set up his own practice in 1928.

Dellit is most noted for his design of the art deco Anzac Memorial in Hyde Park, Sydney, built to commemorate all who fought in the First World War. Dellit won the project in a design competition that attracted over 100 entries. He introduced the new fashion for Art Deco (more familiar for entertainment buildings) devoid of any classical details and adding a stepped roof. Dellit engaged the sculptor, Rayner Hoff, to create the statues and bas-reliefs for the monument.

Dellit continued to complete several commercial and residential buildings during the 1930s.

Notable Works

Kyle House

After beginning his private practice in 1928, Dellit's first major project was Kyle House in Macquarie Place, Sydney. The building, notable for its strong vertical lines and dominating ground floor arch, is considered among the earliest examples of Sydney commercial architecture embracing the Inter-War Art Deco style.

Anzac Memorial
Dellit's Anzac Memorial, within Hyde Park Sydney, is considered to be the "epitome" of pairing of the symmetrical classicism of the Moderne style architecture with Art Deco, decorative embellishments. Dellit's "masterpiece" is complemented by Rayner Hoff's Art Deco sculptures and reliefs depicting the men of the First Australian Imperial Force.

Kinselas Funeral Chapel
Built in 1910 at the present location of Taylor Square Darlinghurst. The original building was converted into an Art Deco style by Dellit after being purchased by funeral director Charles Kinsela in 1932. The building, which is now used as a bar, contains the work of Rayner Hoff and is considered among the best examples of Art Deco "funerary spaces" in Sydney.

Personal life
Dellit married Victoria Clara Millar on 15 October 1921 in Queensland. Children of the marriage were Portia, Albert Victor (known as Victor) and Deirdre. Victor was also a prominent architect.

In 1942 Dellit died from cancer in Hornsby near Sydney, NSW.

References

External links
 Brief biography (Sydney Architecture)

1898 births
1942 deaths
New South Wales architects
20th-century Australian architects
Deaths from cancer in New South Wales